The scaled inverse chi-squared distribution is the distribution for x = 1/s2, where s2 is a sample mean of the squares of ν independent normal random variables that have mean 0 and inverse variance 1/σ2 = τ2.  The distribution is therefore parametrised by the two quantities ν and τ2, referred to as the number of chi-squared degrees of freedom and the scaling parameter, respectively.

This family of scaled inverse chi-squared distributions is closely related to two other distribution families, those of the inverse-chi-squared distribution and the inverse-gamma distribution.  Compared to the inverse-chi-squared distribution, the scaled distribution has an extra parameter τ2, which scales the distribution horizontally and vertically, representing the inverse-variance of the original underlying process.  Also, the scaled inverse chi-squared distribution is presented as the distribution for the inverse of the mean of ν squared deviates, rather than the inverse of their sum.  The two distributions thus have the relation that if 
   then   
Compared to the inverse gamma distribution, the scaled inverse chi-squared distribution describes the same data distribution, but using a different parametrization, which may be more convenient in some circumstances. Specifically, if
   then   
Either form may be used to represent the maximum entropy distribution for a fixed first inverse moment  and first logarithmic moment .

The scaled inverse chi-squared distribution also has a particular use in Bayesian statistics, somewhat unrelated to its use as a predictive distribution for x = 1/s2.  Specifically, the scaled inverse chi-squared distribution can be used as a conjugate prior for the variance parameter of a normal distribution. In this context the scaling parameter is denoted by σ02 rather than by τ2, and has a different interpretation.  The application has been more usually presented using the inverse-gamma distribution formulation instead; however, some authors, following in particular Gelman et al. (1995/2004) argue that the inverse chi-squared parametrisation is more intuitive.

Characterization

The cumulative distribution function is

The characteristic function is

where  is the modified Bessel function of the second kind.

Parameter estimation

The maximum likelihood estimate of  can be found using Newton's method on:

where  is the digamma function. An initial estimate can be found by taking the formula for mean and solving it for   Let  be the sample mean.

Bayesian estimation of the variance of a normal distribution

The scaled inverse chi-squared distribution has a second important application, in the Bayesian estimation of the variance of a Normal distribution.

According to Bayes' theorem, the posterior probability distribution for quantities of interest is proportional to the product of a prior distribution for the quantities and a likelihood function:
 
where D represents the data and I represents any initial information about σ2 that we may already have.

The simplest scenario arises if the mean μ is already known; or, alternatively, if it is the conditional distribution of σ2 that is sought, for a particular assumed value of μ.

Then the likelihood term L(σ2|D) = p(D|σ2) has the familiar form

Combining this with the rescaling-invariant prior p(σ2|I) = 1/σ2, which can be argued (e.g. following Jeffreys) to be the least informative possible prior for σ2 in this problem, gives a combined posterior probability

This form can be recognised as that of a scaled inverse chi-squared distribution, with parameters ν = n and τ2 = s2 = (1/n) Σ (xi-μ)2

Gelman et al remark that the re-appearance of this distribution, previously seen in a sampling context, may seem remarkable; but given the choice of prior the "result is not surprising".

In particular, the choice of a rescaling-invariant prior for σ2 has the result that the probability for the ratio of σ2 / s2 has the same form (independent of the conditioning variable) when conditioned on s2 as when conditioned on σ2:

In the sampling-theory case, conditioned on σ2, the probability distribution for (1/s2) is a scaled inverse chi-squared distribution; and so the probability distribution for σ2 conditioned on s2, given a scale-agnostic prior, is also a scaled inverse chi-squared distribution.

Use as an informative prior 
If more is known about the possible values of σ2, a distribution from the scaled inverse chi-squared family, such as Scale-inv-χ2(n0, s02) can be a convenient form to represent a more informative prior for σ2, as if from the result of n0 previous observations (though n0 need not necessarily be a whole number):

Such a prior would lead to the posterior distribution

which is itself a scaled inverse chi-squared distribution.  The scaled inverse chi-squared distributions are thus a convenient conjugate prior family for σ2 estimation.

Estimation of variance when mean is unknown 

If the mean is not known, the most uninformative prior that can be taken for it is arguably the translation-invariant prior p(μ|I) ∝ const., which gives the following joint posterior distribution for μ and σ2,

The marginal posterior distribution for σ2 is obtained from the joint posterior distribution by integrating out over μ,

Related distributions
 If  then 
 If  (Inverse-chi-squared distribution) then 
 If  then  (Inverse-chi-squared distribution)
 If  then  (Inverse-gamma distribution)
 Scaled inverse chi square distribution is a special case of type 5 Pearson distribution

References 
 Gelman A. et al (1995), Bayesian Data Analysis, pp 474–475; also pp 47, 480

Continuous distributions
Exponential family distributions